Jon Ronson (born 10 May 1967) is a British-American journalist, author, and filmmaker whose works include Them: Adventures with Extremists (2001), The Men Who Stare at Goats (2004), and The Psychopath Test (2011). He has been described as a gonzo journalist, becoming a faux-naïf character in his stories. He produces informal but sceptical investigations of controversial fringe politics and science. He has published nine books and his work has appeared in publications such as The Guardian, City Life and Time Out. He has made several BBC Television documentary films and two documentary series for Channel 4.

Early life 
Ronson was born in Cardiff on 10 May 1967. He attended Cardiff High School and later worked for CBC Radio in Cardiff before moving to London to study for a media degree at the Polytechnic of Central London.

Career

Writing 

Ronson's first book, Clubbed Class (1994), is a travelogue in which he bluffs his way into a jet set lifestyle, in search of the world's finest holiday.

His second book, Them: Adventures with Extremists (2001), chronicles his experiences with people labelled as extremists. Subjects in the book include David Icke, Randy Weaver, Omar Bakri Muhammad, Ian Paisley, Alex Jones, and Thomas Robb. Ronson also follows independent investigators of secretive groups such as the Bilderberg Group. The narrative tells of Ronson's attempts to infiltrate the "shadowy cabal" fabled, by these conspiracy theorists, to rule the world. The book was described by Louis Theroux as a "funny and compulsively readable picaresque adventure through a paranoid shadow world." Variety magazine announced in September 2005 that Them was purchased by Universal Pictures for a feature film.

Ronson contributed the memoir A Fantastic Life to the Picador anthology Truth or Dare, in 2004.

Ronson's third book, The Men Who Stare at Goats (2004), deals with the secret New Age unit within the United States Army called the First Earth Battalion. Ronson investigates people such as Major General Albert Stubblebine III, former head of intelligence, who believe that people can walk through walls with the right mental preparation, and that goats can be killed simply by staring at them. Much was based on the ideas of Lt. Col. Jim Channon, ret., who wrote the First Earth Battalion Operations Manual in 1979, inspired by the emerging Human Potential Movement of California. The book suggests that these New Age military ideas mutated over the decades to influence interrogation techniques at Guantanamo Bay. An eponymous film of the book was released in 2009, in which Ronson's investigations were fictionalised and structured around a journey to Iraq. Ronson is played by the actor Ewan McGregor in the film.

Ronson's fourth book, Out of the Ordinary: True Tales of Everyday Craziness (2006; Picador and Guardian Books) is a collection of his Guardian articles, mostly those concerning his domestic life. A companion volume was What I Do: More True Tales of Everyday Craziness (2007).

The Psychopath Test: A Journey Through the Madness Industry (2011) is Ronson's fifth book. In it, he explores the nature of psychopathic behaviour, learning how to apply the Hare Psychopathy Checklist, and investigating its reliability. He interviews people in facilities for the criminally insane as well as potential psychopaths in corporate boardrooms. The book's findings have been rejected by The Society for the Scientific Study of Psychopathy and by Robert D. Hare, creator of the Hare Psychopathy Checklist. Hare described the book as "frivolous, shallow, and professionally disconcerting". 

Lost at Sea: The Jon Ronson Mysteries (2012) is Ronson's sixth book and is a collection of previously published articles by him.

Ronson's book So You've Been Publicly Shamed (2015) concerns the effects of public humiliation in the internet age.

Radio 
Ronson's main radio work is the production and presentation of a BBC Radio 4 programme, Jon Ronson on... The program has been nominated for a Sony award four times. In August 2008, Radio 4 aired "Robbie Williams and Jon Ronson Journey to the Other Side", a documentary by Jon Ronson about pop star Williams' fascination with UFOs and the paranormal.

In the early 1990s, Ronson was offered the position of sidekick on Terry Christian's Show on Manchester radio station KFM. Ronson also co-presented a KFM show with Craig Cash, who went on to write and perform in The Royle Family and Early Doors.

Ronson contributes to Public Radio International in the United States, particularly the program This American Life. , he has contributed segments to 13 episodes including "Them" (#201), "Naming Names" (#211), "Family Physics" (#214), "Habeas Schmabeas" (#310), "It's Never Over" (#314), "The Spokesman" (#338), "Pro Se" (#385), "First Contact" (#411), "The Psychopath Test" (#436), "Secret Identity" (#506), "Tarred and Feathered" (#522), "To Be Real" (#620), "Beware the Jabberwock" (#670).

Ronson hosted and wrote the podcast The Butterfly Effect, which was released in November 2017 by Audible and was made subsequently available on other podcasting platforms. The show focuses on internet pornography, and Fabian Thylmann and PornHub's effect on the industry. Ronson subsequently also hosted and wrote the podcast The Last Days of August, released in January 2019. It focuses on the 2017 death of pornographic actress August Ames.

Ronson returned to the BBC in 2021 with Things Fell Apart: a podcast on the Culture Wars for BBC Sounds in a similar format to his previous efforts for Amazon.

Music 
In the late 1980s, Ronson replaced Mark Radcliffe as the keyboard player for the Frank Sidebottom band for a number of performances.

Ronson was the manager of the Manchester indie band Man From Delmonte.

Television 
Ronson presented the late nineties talk show For the Love of..., in which each week he would interview a gathering of guests and experts on different phenomena and conspiracy theories. Ronson has also appeared as a guest on various shows, including Alan Davies: As Yet Untitled.

Films 
Ronson sold the film rights to The Men Who Stare at Goats, and subsequently a film of the same name was released in 2009 as a comedy war film directed by Grant Heslov and written by Peter Straughan. According to Ronson's DVD-commentary, the journalist-character Bob Wilton (Ewan McGregor) did experience some elements of Ronson's self-recounted story from the book. However, unlike Ronson, Wilton was an American from Ann Arbor. Also, unlike Ronson, Wilton went to Iraq.

In the process of visiting the set during the shoot, Ronson began a collaborative writing project with Straughan. This was the screenplay for Frank, a fictitious feature film inspired by Ronson's time in Frank Sidebottom's band.

Ronson co-wrote, with Bong Joon-ho, the screenplay for the 2017 Netflix film Okja.

Personal life 
Ronson and his wife Elaine have one son.

Ronson is Jewish and calls himself a "distinguished supporter" of Humanists UK. He is a fan of the football team Arsenal FC and has spoken of his "adoration" of the club.

In an interview for Louis Theroux's Grounded podcast, Ronson states that he became a naturalised American citizen in early 2020.

Works

Books 
{| class="wikitable"
|-
! Date first published !! Title !! Publisher information
|-
| 27 October 1994 || Clubbed Class || Pavilion Books Ltd, hardcover, 
|-
| 2001 || Them: Adventures with Extremists || Picador, hardcover, 2001,  Simon & Schuster, hardcover, 2002,  Simon & Schuster, paperback, 1 January 2003, 
|-
| 19 November 2004 || The Men Who Stare at Goats || Picador, hardcover, 
|-
| 3 November 2006 || Out of the Ordinary: True Tales of Everyday Craziness || Picador/Guardian Books, paperback, 
|-
| 2 November 2007 || What I Do: More True Tales Of Everyday Craziness || Picador/Guardian Books, paperback, 
|-
| 12 May 2011 || The Psychopath Test: A Journey Through the Madness Industry || Riverhead Books, hardcover, 
|-
| 22 November 2011 || The Amazing Adventures of Phoenix Jones || Riverhead Books, e-book
|-
| 30 October 2012 || Lost at Sea: The Jon Ronson Mysteries || Penguin Group, hardcover, 
|-
| 27 March 2014 || Frank: The True Story that Inspired the Movie || Picador, paperback, 
|-
| 12 March 2015 || So You've Been Publicly Shamed || Picador, paperback, 
|-
| October 2016 || The Elephant in the Room: A Journey into the Trump Campaign and the 'Alt-Right''' || E-book, Kindle single
|}

 Filmography 
 The Ronson Mission (1994) BBC 2
 New York to California: A Great British Odyssey (1996) Channel 4
 Hotel Auschwitz (1996) BBC Radio 4
 Tottenham Ayatollah (1997) Channel 4
 Critical Condition (1997) Channel 4
 Dr Paisley, I Presume (1998) Channel 4
 New Klan (1999) Channel 4
 Secret Rulers of the World (2001) Channel 4
 The Double Life of Jonathan King (2002) Channel 4
 Kidneys for Jesus (2003) Channel 4
 I Am, Unfortunately, Randy Newman (2004) Channel 4
 Crazy Rulers of the World (2004) Channel 4
 Part 1: "The Men Who Stare at Goats"
 Part 2: "Funny Torture"
 Part 3: "The Psychic Footsoldiers"
 Death in Santaland (2007) More 4, about a foiled school shooting plot in the Christmas-themed town of North Pole, Alaska.
 Reverend Death (2008) Channel 4, about George Exoo, an advocate of euthanasia.
 Stanley Kubrick's Boxes (2008)
 Revelations (2009)
 Escape and Control (2011)
 Frank (2014)
 Okja (2017)
 Comrade Detective (2017) as Himself

 References 

 External links 
 

 Picador UK publisher's author page
 Jon Ronson On... radio programme
 Ronson's Column Archive, The Guardian 
 
 In Depth interview with Ronson, 3 May 2015.

Interviews
 My friend the extremist: Omar Bakri, This American Life, 7 December 2001
 Interview, Joanna Smith Rakoff, Salon.com, 14 March 2002
 Interview, Andrew Lawless, threemonkeysonline.com, February 2005
 Interview, rinf.com, February 2005
 Biographical Interview, Anthony Brockway, ntlworld.com, May 2005
 Video interview, Robert Llewellyn on Carpool, blip.tv Jon Ronson audio interviews (2005–2009), littleatoms.com''

1967 births
Living people
20th-century Welsh writers
21st-century Welsh writers
Alumni of the University of Westminster
British documentary filmmakers
The Guardian journalists
Journalists from Cardiff
Welsh humanists
Welsh Jews
Welsh journalists
Welsh non-fiction writers